is a Japanese manga series written by Wataru Hinekure and illustrated by Aruko. It was serialized in Bessatsu Margaret from June 2019 to June 2022. A spin-off, titled Kieta Hatsukoi: Shōgekijō, began serialization in July 2021. A live action television drama adaptation premiered in October 2021.

In 2022, My Love Mix-Up! won the 67th Shogakukan Manga Award in the shōjo category.

Cast
Sota Aoki

Kōsuke Ida

Mio Hashimoto

Hayato "Akkun" Aida

Masahiro Taniguchi

Jun Tomita

Taishō Nakabayashi

Media

Manga
The series is written by Wataru Hinekure and illustrated by Aruko. It began serialization in Bessatsu Margaret on June 13, 2019. The series completed its serialization on June 13, 2022. In June 2021, it was revealed the series would get a spin-off titled Kieta Hatsukoi: Shōgekijō, which started serialization in the same magazine as the main series on July 13, 2021. As of July 2022, the main series' individual chapters have been collected into nine tankōbon volumes.

In February 2021, Viz Media announced they licensed the series for English publication.

Volume list

TV drama
A live action TV drama adaptation was announced in August 2021. The series was directed by Shōgo Kusano and Tadaaki Hōrai, with scripts by Tsutomu Kuroiwa, and Harumi Fuuki composing the music. Ren Meguro and Shunsuke Michieda performed the leads. It premiered on TV Asahi on October 9, 2021. Viki licensed the series for an English release.

Reception
My Love Mix-Up! won the 67th Shogakukan Manga Award in the shōjo category in 2022. In the 2021 edition of the Kono Manga ga Sugoi! guidebook, the series tied with A Sign of Affection as the ninth highest ranked manga for female audiences. The series was also nominated for the first  manga award.

The television drama series was featured on Teen Vogue's best BL dramas of 2021 list.

References

External links
 

2021 Japanese television series debuts
Japanese television dramas based on manga
LGBT in anime and manga
Romantic comedy anime and manga
Shōjo manga
Shueisha manga
TV Asahi original programming
Viz Media manga
Winners of the Shogakukan Manga Award for shōjo manga